HIM International Music is a Taiwanese independent record label and artist management company established in 1999. It was previously known as Grand Music International Inc. (宇宙國際音樂股份有限公司). It is an International Federation of the Phonographic Industry (IFPI) member record company.

History
HIM International Music started off as two different labels, Grand Music and Tiger Music. Grand Music had a number of successful artists. Yuan Wei Jen released his first album under Grand Music, and earned a nomination for Best Mandarin Male Performer at the 12th Golden Melody Awards. A while after the nomination, Yuan put his solo career on hiatus, and master produced albums for HIM International artists until 2004. After promotions for their compilation album ended in 2000, Power Station joined Grand Music. In August, Grand Music held a Universal Talent and Beauty Contest to search for new talent. The finals were televised on China Television's TV Citizen; the winner was Jen Chia-Hsüan. Grand Music eventually selected finalists Chen Chia-Hwa and Tien Fu-Chen as well, putting the three girls into a group called S.H.E. On October 1, 2000, Grand Music underwent a name change and became known as HIM International Music. On May 16, 2002, Tiger Music became HIM Music Publishing, which, to this day, operates under HIM International Music. In 2010, HIM International Music announced that they will not only be managing record labels but they will also signa contract with Mediacorp Actress, Jesseca Liu after her contract expires in Mediacorp . In 2012, HIM International Music signs with the Singer James.

In 2016, HIM International Music Signs a contract with former child actor, Boon Hui Lu who was nominated for Young Talent Award for 2 different years in 2007 & 2010.

Artists

Male singers
Yoga Lin
Yo Lee
Yu Chiu-hsin (Power Station)
Yen Chih-lin (Power Station)
Ian Chen (F.I.R.)
(F.I.R.)
Wang Yao-yang (王耀揚)

Male artistes

Female singers

Yisa Yu
Olivia Ong
Boon Hui Lu

(F.I.R.)
Luyi (盧一辰)
Where Chou

Female artistes
Jesseca Liu
Joanne Tseng

Mu-mu (林葦妮)

Groups
Power Station
F.I.R.

Creative
(illustrator)
(illustrator)
(illustrator)
Lost (迷路) (illustrator)
Morita (陳森田) (illustrator)
Zzifan z (illustrator)

Sportsmen
Chiang Hung-Chieh
Ai Fukuhara

Beauty
(make-up artist)

Subsidiaries



HM Music
Sabrina Lo (羅莎莎)
Yo Lee

Blooming Music & Arts
Nauledge (黃祝賢儒)

Original soundtracks

See also
 List of companies of Taiwan
 List of record labels

References

External links 
 Official homepage
 HIM Channel on YouTube

 
Taiwanese record labels
Pop record labels
Rock record labels
IFPI members
Record labels established in 1999
Taiwanese independent record labels
Taiwanese companies established in 1999